She's Got You is an EP released by American country music singer, Patsy Cline on April 20, 1962. It was the second EP Cline released in that year. 

She's Got You contained two new songs: the title track and "Strange." The title track was released as a single in January 1962 and was climbing the charts during the time of this EP's release. Its B-side was "Strange." The EP would serve as the temporary source of acquiring Cline's new single until the album containing it, Sentimentally Yours, would be released that August. The other two songs included on She's Got You were cuts from her 1961 album: "The Wayward Wind" and "I Love You So Much it Hurts." 

The EP was released on a record and the cover photograph was taken by photographer, Hal Buksbaum.

Track listing
Side one
"She's Got You" – (Hank Cochran) 2:58
"Strange" – (Fred Burch, Mel Tillis) 2:13

Side two
"The Wayward Wind" – (Stanley Lebowsky, Herb Newman) 3:15
"I Love You So Much it Hurts" – (Floyd Tillman) 2:11

Personnel
All recording sessions took place at Bradley Film and Music Studios in Nashville, Tennessee, United States.

 Byron Bach – cello
 Brenton Banks – violin
 George Binkley III – violin
 Harold Bradley – 6-string electric bass
 John Bright – viola
 Cecil Brower – viola
 Patsy Cline – lead vocals
 Floyd Cramer – organ, piano
 Walter Haynes – steel guitar
 Buddy Harman – drums
 Randy Hughes – acoustic guitar
 The Jordanaires – background vocals
 Lillian Hunt – violin
 Grady Martin – electric guitar 
 Bob Moore – acoustic bass
 Suzanne Parker – violin
 Bill Pursell – organ
 Hargus "Pig" Robbins – piano

References

Patsy Cline EPs
1962 EPs
Albums produced by Owen Bradley
Decca Records EPs